Israel Jean Orval Gravelle, sometimes referred to as Orville ‘Red’ Gravelle, (December 7, 1927 – January 18, 1997) was a Canadian ice hockey player. He was a member of the Ottawa RCAF Flyers who won the gold medal in ice hockey for Canada at the 1948 Winter Olympics in St. Moritz.

References

External links
profile at databaseOlympics
profile at Sports Reference

1927 births
1997 deaths
Ice hockey players at the 1948 Winter Olympics
Olympic gold medalists for Canada
Olympic ice hockey players of Canada
Olympic medalists in ice hockey
Medalists at the 1948 Winter Olympics
Ice hockey people from Gatineau